The 1963 Mediterranean Games football tournament was the 4th edition of the Mediterranean Games men's football tournament. The football tournament was held in Naples, Italy between the 18–28 September 1963 as part of the 1963 Mediterranean Games.

Participating teams
The following countries have participated for the final tournament:

Venues

Squads

Group stage
All times local : CET (UTC+1)

Group A

Group B

Knockout stage

Third place match

Final

Tournament classification

References 

1963
Sports at the 1963 Mediterranean Games
1963 in African football
1963 in Asian football
1963